Stadionul Comunal is a multi-use stadium in Liești, Romania. It is used mostly for football matches, is the home ground of Sporting Liești and has a capacity of 2,500 people on standing terrace.

External links
Stadionul Comunal (Liești) at soccerway.com

Football venues in Romania
Buildings and structures in Galați County